Walter Lees (14 December 1916 – 9 July 2012) was an English professional golfer. He was the younger brother of Arthur and Harold, both professional golfers.

Lees won the 1946 Midland Professional Championship at Sandwell Park Golf Club, 4 strokes ahead of Jack Cawsey and Leslie Cliffe. He was runner-up in the 1949 Yorkshire Evening News Tournament at Moortown Golf Club. The tournament was run as a match-play event that year and Lees won five matches to reach the final, beating Roberto De Vicenzo, Jimmy Adams and Dai Rees. Having beaten Rees in the morning, he met Sam King In the afternoon final. One down after 8 holes he lost the next five to give King a 6&5 victory. The next month he finished 17th in the Open Championship. He had been in 6th place after a good third round 69, just two shots behind the leaders, but a last round 78 dropped his down the field.

Lees was an assistant at Abbeydale Golf Club from 1933 but after the war he was an assistant to his brother Arthur at Dore and Totley. He became the professional at Shipley Golf Club in 1948 and was there until he retired in 1985.

Professional wins
1946 Midland Professional Championship

Results in major championships

Note: Lees only played in The Open Championship.

CUT = missed the half-way cut

References

English male golfers
Sportspeople from Sheffield
Sportspeople from Shipley, West Yorkshire
1916 births
2012 deaths